Dare to Dream is the second studio album by the American country music singer Billy Gilman, released in 2001 on Epic Records Nashville. Although its singles "Elisabeth" and "She's My Girl" both fell short of the Top 40 on the Billboard country singles charts, the album was certified Gold by the RIAA.

Track listing 
"She's My Girl" (Brian Baker, Zack Turner, Lonnie Wilson) – 3:08
"Our First Kiss" (Bonnie Baker, Bob DiPiero) – 3:11
"Elisabeth" (Kim Patton-Johnston, Liz Rose) – 4:22
"I've Got to Make It to Summer" (Don Cook, David Malloy) – 4:30
"My Time on Earth" (Tommy Conners, Adam Hughes, David Vincent Williams) – 4:26
"You Don't You Won't" (David Bassett, Michael Himelstein) – 3:28
"She's Everything You Want" (Mary Danna, Michael Gerald Lunn, Malloy) – 2:22
"God's Alive and Well" (Malloy, Bruce Roberts) – 4:28
"The Woman in My Life" (Cook, Bob Regan, Leslie Satcher) – 3:40
"Almost Love" (Tom Douglas, Marcus Hummon) – 4:14
"Some Things I Know" (Sally Barris, Burton Collins) – 2:36
"Shamey, Shamey, Shame" (Randle Chowing, Mark Morton, Alan Ross) – 2:50

Notable tracks
"Some Things I Know" was recorded by the country music singer James Bonamy for his 1997 album Roots and Wings. It was also recorded by the country singer Lee Ann Womack as a duet with Vince Gill three years before Gilman's recording (in 1998) and served as the title track for her album Some Things I Know.

Personnel
 Mark Casstevens – acoustic guitar
 Eric Darken – percussion
 Billy Gilman – lead vocals
 Mike Haynes – trumpet
 Jim Horn – baritone saxophone, horn arrangements
 David Hungate – bass guitar
 John Barlow Jarvis – keyboards
 Alison Krauss – vocal ad-libs
 Michael Lunn – electric guitar
 Greg Morrow – drums
 The Nashville String Machine – strings
 Jimmy Nichols – keyboards, background vocals
 Billy Panda – acoustic guitar
 Greg Piccolo – tenor saxophone
 Michael Rhodes – bass guitar
 Brent Rowan – electric guitar
 Leslie Satcher – background vocals
 The Slugs – background vocals
 Havey Thompson – tenor saxophone
 Robby Turner – steel guitar
 Cindy Richardson-Walker – background vocals
 Bergen White – string arrangements
 Lonnie Wilson – background vocals

Chart performance

Weekly charts

Year end charts

Certifications and sales

References

2001 albums
Epic Records albums
Billy Gilman albums
Albums produced by David Malloy